Vujadinović is a Serbian surname, derived from the male given name Vujadin, may refer to:

Đorđe Vujadinović, footballer and football manager
Maša Vujadinović, singer
Miroslav Vujadinović, Montenegrin footballer
Nikola Vujadinović, Serbian footballer
Rajko Vujadinović, footballer

See also
Vukadinović
Vujasinović

Montenegrin surnames
Serbian surnames